Pseuderia is a genus of orchids consisting of about 20 species distributed from the Moluccas through New Guinea to Samoa, Fiji and Micronesia. The genus has its center of diversity in New Guinea.

Species accepted as of June 2014:

Pseuderia amblyornidis (Rchb.f.) Ormerod - New Guinea
Pseuderia brevifolia J.J.Sm. - New Guinea
Pseuderia diversifolia J.J.Sm. - New Guinea
Pseuderia floribunda Schltr. - New Guinea
Pseuderia foliosa (Brongn.) Schltr. - Maluku, New Guinea
Pseuderia frutex (Schltr.) Schltr. - New Guinea
Pseuderia ledermannii Schltr. - New Guinea
Pseuderia micronesiaca Schltr. - Pohnpei
Pseuderia nigricans Ridl. - New Guinea
Pseuderia pauciflora Schltr. - New Guinea
Pseuderia platyphylla L.O.Williams - Fiji
Pseuderia ramosa L.O.Williams - Samoa, Futuna
Pseuderia robusta Schltr. - New Guinea
Pseuderia samarana Meneses, Z.D. & Cootes, J - Philippines
Pseuderia sepikana Schltr. - New Guinea
Pseuderia similis (Schltr.) Schltr. - New Guinea, Solomon Islands, Santa Cruz Islands
Pseuderia smithiana C.Schweinf. - Fiji
Pseuderia sympodialis J.J.Sm. - New Guinea
Pseuderia takeuchii Ormerod - Papua New Guinea
Pseuderia trachychila (Kraenzl.) Schltr.
Pseuderia wariana Schltr. - New Guinea

Reference

External links
Nationaal Herbarium Nederland, Pseuderia Schltr., Repert. Spec. Nov. Regni Veg. Beih. 1 (1912) 344 
Omerod, Paul. 2005. Papuasian Orchid Studies 2. Austrobaileya 7(1)

Eriinae
Podochileae genera